The Rochelle School, which was previously known as the Martha Perry Institute, is a historic site in Rochelle, Florida. The school was built on land given by Sallie Perry, daughter of Madison Starke Perry, and named for her mother Martha Perry. It is located off SR 234. On April 2, 1973, it was added to the U.S. National Register of Historic Places.

References

External links
 Alachua County listings at National Register of Historic Places
 Alachua County listings at Florida's Office of Cultural and Historical Programs
 Madison Starke Perry & Martha Peay Starke at RootsWeb.com

National Register of Historic Places in Alachua County, Florida
Defunct schools in Florida